Watershed is the sixth and most recent solo studio album by k.d. lang and was released on . It is her first collection of original material since 2000's Invincible Summer. In the US, it debuted at #8 on the Billboard 200, with approximately 41,000 copies sold. In Australia it debuted at #3 on the ARIA Albums Chart and in its ninth week moved to the #1 spot, up from the #38 position one week earlier. In the UK, it debuted and peaked at #35.

A limited edition of the album was released in deluxe packaging which contained a bonus disc with four live tracks and an interview.

Track listing

Personnel
 K.D. Lang – banjo, guitar, percussion, piano, harp, keyboards, vocals, drum programming, production
 Teddy Borowiecki – organ, guitar, piano, keyboards, programming, vibraphone, string conductor, photography
 Grecco Buratto – guitar
 Danny Frankel – percussion, drums
 Jon Hassell – trumpet
 Greg Leisz – guitar, electric guitar, steel guitar
 Ben Mink – acoustic guitar
 Noam Pikelny – banjo
 David Piltch – bass, guitar, percussion, electric bass, drums, acoustic bass, production
 Bryan Sutton – guitar
Technical
 Lynne Earls – engineering, programming, editing
 David Leonard – mixing, string engineering, string mixing
 Steve Jensen, Martin Kirkup – management
 Glen Nakasako, Jeri Heiden – photography
 John Heiden, Nick Steinhardt – design

Charts

Weekly charts

Year-end charts

Certifications

References

External links

2008 albums
K.d. lang albums